Piaski Duchowne is a village in the administrative district of Gmina Brochów, within Sochaczew County, Masovian Voivodeship, in east-central Poland.

References 

Piaski Duchowne